Wrightwood is a station on Metra's SouthWest Service in Wrightwood neighborhood in Chicago, Illinois. In Metra's zone-based fare system, Wrightwood is in zone C. As of 2018, Wrightwood is the 154th busiest of Metra's 236 non-downtown stations, with an average of 261 weekday boardings. There is an unstaffed shelter and across from the station is Norfolk Southern's Landers Yard.

As of January 16, 2023, Wrightwood is served by 27 trains (14 inbound, 13 outbound) on weekdays. Saturday service is currently suspended.

CTA Bus Connections
  52A South Kedzie 
  79 79th

References

External links 

Metra stations in Chicago
Railway stations in the United States opened in 1984
Former Wabash Railroad stations